The Buick Open was a PGA Tour golf tournament from 1958 to 2009. In 2007, the tournament was held at the end of June, a change from its traditional spot between The Open Championship and the PGA Championship. Regardless, many prominent players used it as a "tune-up" for the subsequent major.

For the event's first decade, the Buick Open Invitational was played at Warwick Hills Golf and Country Club in Grand Blanc, Michigan. After 1969, professional golf events in the area fell off the PGA Tour schedule and a series of pro-ams and other similarly unofficial events took place, mostly at Flint Golf Club in Flint, Michigan.

Flint native, and PGA touring professional Larry Mancour had returned to Michigan to play in the Buick Open and stayed to build the Grand Blanc Golf Club.  He then added nine holes at the Flint Elks Golf Club where he remained the professional for 20 years. He rescued the Buick Open when General Motors dropped sponsorship of the tournament. With local Buick dealers Mancour started the Little Buick Open in 1969. It drew players and fans and led to the rebirth of the Buick Open in 1977.

The Buick Open officially made its return to the PGA Tour in 1977 at the Flint Elks Club, and in 1978 the event returned to Warwick Hills G&CC, where it remained until its demise.

The Associated Press reported July 28, 2009, that General Motors would end its sponsorship of the Buick Open after the 2009 tournament, in order to devote its marketing resources to cars and trucks. The PGA Tour replaced the tournament with the Greenbrier Classic at The Greenbrier in White Sulphur Springs, West Virginia.

As in the 1970s, a series of pro-ams and other unofficial events now take place in Grand Blanc, with the AJGA's Randy Wise Open taking place at Warwick Hills and most pro-ams and a golf festival at the Jewel of Grand Blanc (the former Grand Blanc Golf Club).

In 2014, an unrelated tournament with the same name was started in China. The event is played on PGA Tour China.

In 2018, the former General Motors financing arm, now Ally Bank, returned to Warwick Hills to sponsor a PGA Tour Champions event, The Ally Challenge.  Jim Furyk is the only player to have won both, winning the 2003 Buick Open, and the 2020 Ally Challenge, which also was the Champions' return after the pandemic, winning in his first tournament.

Fans

The 17th hole at Warwick, a par 3, is known for having one of the rowdiest galleries in professional golf. Fans often created chants directed at particular golfers. The famed 17th hole was also known by locals as the second largest outdoor cocktail party in the world (presumably deferring to the annual Florida–Georgia college football game as the largest). Players at the tournament loved the hole because of the atmosphere it creates. "This is a great tournament to play in, it's a beer drinkers' tournament", said John Daly.

Long hitters

In its final years, the tournament was dominated by long hitters. Tiger Woods, Vijay Singh, Brian Bateman, and Kenny Perry combined for eight wins in its final nine years. Several other players ranked highly in driving distance finished second during that span, including Woods, Jason Gore, Geoff Ogilvy, Bubba Watson, and John Daly.

Winners

Notes

References

External links
Coverage on the PGA Tour's official site
Warwick Hills Golf and Country Club

Former PGA Tour events
Golf in Michigan
Sports in Flint, Michigan
Buick
Recurring sporting events established in 1958
Recurring sporting events disestablished in 2009